The Singleton Family Cemetery is a historic cemetery on the western outskirts of Charleston, Arkansas.  Established in the 1870s, it contains more than 120 graves; approximately half of these are marked graves.  It is the oldest site associated with the early formation of Charleston, and several of its earliest settlers are buried here.  The most prominent grave is that of Julia Singleton Cormack, one of the community's first school teachers.  The cemetery continues to be used by the Singleton family descendants.

The cemetery was listed on the National Register of Historic Places in 2005.

See also
 National Register of Historic Places listings in Franklin County, Arkansas

References

External links
 

Cemeteries on the National Register of Historic Places in Arkansas
Buildings and structures in Franklin County, Arkansas
National Register of Historic Places in Franklin County, Arkansas